The Phone Rings Every Night is a 1962 German drama film directed by Géza von Cziffra and starring Ingrid Andree, Karin Heske and Elke Sommer. Two rival gangs clash on a yacht in Saint-Tropez.

Cast
In alphabetical order
 Ingrid Andree
 Karin Heske
 Loni Heuser
 Günter Pfitzmann
 Gunther Philipp
 Elke Sommer
 Leonard Steckel

References

External links
 

1962 films
1962 musical comedy films
German musical comedy films
German crime comedy films
West German films
1960s German-language films
Films directed by Géza von Cziffra
Films set in Saint-Tropez
Films set on the French Riviera
1960s German films